Once Upon a Honeymoon is a 1942 romantic comedy/drama starring Cary Grant, Ginger Rogers, and Walter Slezak, directed by Leo McCarey, and released by RKO Radio Pictures. It was nominated for the Oscar for Best Sound Recording (Stephen Dunn).

Plot
In the days leading up to World War II, Katie O'Hara (Ginger Rogers), an American burlesque performer masquerading as American socialite "Katherine Butt-Smith", pronounced byüt-smith, is about to marry Austrian Baron Von Luber (Walter Slezak). Foreign correspondent Pat O'Toole (Cary Grant) suspects Von Luber of being a Nazi sympathizer and tries unsuccessfully to get information from Katie by deceit, but is warned off by Von Luber.

Undaunted, O'Toole follows the couple to Prague, where O'Hara and Von Luber marry. After the German occupation of Czechoslovakia, the Von Lubers travel to Warsaw, where the Baron sells arms to Polish General Borelski (Albert Bassermann). O'Toole warns the General of the dangers of trusting in Von Luber. When the General tries the weapons he finds out he has been sold duds and plans to notify his government. When the Germans invade Poland, the weapons prove to be defective. Von Luber is arrested on suspicion but warns his young bride not to worry because no one will be able to bear witness against him. Soon after, the General is assassinated along with a young Nazi the Baron has chosen to sacrifice.  While the Baron is in jail O'Hara and O'Toole decide to flee the country. However, O'Hara has given her passport to her Jewish maid Anna, so that the woman and her two children may escape the country. O'Hara and O'Toole escape to Norway, Holland, Belgium and Paris, all of which sequentially fall to the Germans with the clandestine help of Von Luber.

In Paris, O'Hara and O'Toole go to have new passports made. They meet Gaston Le Blanc (Albert Dekker), an American counterintelligence agent posing as a photographer. LeBlanc persuades O'Hara to return to the Baron and work as a spy. Von Luber becomes suspicious due to O'Hara's persistent questioning. O'Toole agrees to broadcast pro-Nazi propaganda after the Baron threatens to turn O'Hara over to the Gestapo. O'Toole is then contacted by American counterintelligence who ask him to accept the offer and betray the Baron. When O'Hara is found with LeBlanc, who is shot by two Nazi agents, she is placed under house arrest. Anna finds her in the hotel and aids in her escape. O'Toole goes on the air, but after O'Hara shows up at the studio, he cleverly manages to make it look as if the Baron is trying to overthrow Hitler. Von Luber is arrested, and Pat and Katie sneak away.

They board a ship for America, but Katie later runs into Von Luber on board; the Baron was able to talk his way out of his troubles. Now he is on his way to the United States to continue his subversive activities. They struggle and Von Luber falls overboard. O'Hara tells O'Toole and hesitantly he agrees to tell the Captain. The Captain turns the ship around to search for Von Luber, but when O'Hara says that Von Luber cannot swim, the Captain happily turns the ship back towards America.

Cast
 Cary Grant as Patrick 'Pat' O'Toole
 Ginger Rogers as Katie O'Hara / Katherine Butt-Smith / Baroness Katherine Von Luber
 Walter Slezak as Obergruppenführer Baron Franz Von Luber
 Albert Dekker as Gaston Le Blanc
 Albert Bassermann as General Borelski
 Ferike Boros as Elsa 
 John Banner as German Capt. Von Kleinoch 
 Harry Shannon as Ed Cumberland 
 Natasha Lytess as Anna
 Emory Parnell as Quisling

Production
Once Upon a Honeymoon was Walter Slezak's first American film.

Reception
The film was a hit, earning RKO a profit of $282,000.

See also
 List of American films of 1942

References

External links
 
 
 
 

1942 films
1940s romantic comedy-drama films
American black-and-white films
Films directed by Leo McCarey
American romantic comedy-drama films
1940s English-language films
World War II films made in wartime
Films scored by Robert Emmett Dolan
Films set in Vienna
Films set in Prague
Films set in Poland
Films set in Norway
Films set in the Netherlands
Films set in Belgium
Films set in Paris
Films about Nazi Germany
Films about journalists
1942 comedy films
1942 drama films
RKO Pictures films